Earl Spencer may refer to:

People, non-peerage 
 Earl Winfield Spencer Jr. (1888–1950), United States Navy pilot; first husband of Wallis, Duchess of Windsor
 Earle Spencer (1925–1973), American big band leader from the late 1940s

Peerage 
 Earl Spencer (peerage), title in the peerage of Great Britain
 John Spencer, 1st Earl Spencer (1734–1783), a grandson of the 3rd Earl of Sunderland through his third and youngest son
 George Spencer, 2nd Earl Spencer (1758–1834), politician
 John Spencer, 3rd Earl Spencer (1782–1845), politician, better known as Lord Althorp
 Frederick Spencer, 4th Earl Spencer (1798–1857), naval commander
 John Spencer, 5th Earl Spencer (1835–1910), politician
 Charles Spencer, 6th Earl Spencer (1857–1922), courtier and politician
 Albert Spencer, 7th Earl Spencer (1892–1975), army officer and politician
 John Spencer, 8th Earl Spencer (1924–1992), father of Diana, Princess of Wales
 Charles Spencer, 9th Earl Spencer (born 1964), younger brother of Diana, Princess of Wales

Vessels